Sea denial is a military term describing attempts to deny the enemy's ability to use the sea without necessarily attempting to control the sea for its own use. It is a parallel concept to sea control. The two concepts: sea control and sea denial are not mutually opposed, but whereas the object of sea control is to use the sea for oneself, the object of sea denial seeks to deny the enemy effective use of the sea. According to Corbett the object of sea denial, therefore, is negative and defensive in nature. It is a less ambitious strategy than sea control and is often carried out by the weaker power (Corbett 2018, p. 144). Sea denial can be an alternative to sea control, or can work in concert with it. A navy is bound to have different objectives across different theatres of operations. It is possible to pursue sea denial in one area of operation while at the same time pursuing sea control in another. Sea denial can even act as a direct complement to sea control. It is possible for a nation to aspire to a high degree of sea control in their littorals, whilst at the same time pursuing sea denial outside the littorals, as was seen with the Soviet Union during periods of the Cold War. This kind of zone defence strategy is popularly called Anti-Access/Area Denial (A2/AD) in modern terms (Till 2018, p. 193 – 197; Speller 2019, p. 118 – 132).

Sea denial is achieved in many different ways. The method chosen might depend on various different factors such as geography, ambition and capabilities being some of the key factors. Geographically it is easier to conduct sea denial operations in choke points (narrow waters, straights or congested waters for instance) or one’s own littorals. In relation to ambition it is important to be mindful of the objective, both one’s own and the opposition's. The greater an opposition's dependency on the sea the greater the effect of successful sea denial operations. In order to succeed with sea denial operations, the right capabilities are needed, some examples are naval mines, anti-ship missiles and submarines. The greater the capabilities the greater the chance of success. All this translates to different activities with sea denial as its object. These range from barrier operations that seek to hinder access to certain areas, commerce raiding that require the enemy to put resources into escorting and thus disputing sea control, asymmetrical warfare and skirmishes on military vessels that disputes sea control or by maintaining a fleet in being that threatens offensive operations without actually conducting them (Speller 2019, p. 118 - 132).

During World War I and World War II, Germany pursued sea denial using U-boats. Owing to the substantial superiority of the Royal Navy's surface forces, Germany's Imperial Navy (in World War I) and Kriegsmarine (in World War II) had little hope of seizing control of the high seas, but with submarines the Germans could hope to defeat the British by choking off their crucial access to seaborne commerce. In both wars, the United Kingdom successfully resisted the German strategy with a combination of strict rationing and the development of anti-submarine weapons and techniques. During the Cold War, the Soviet Union invested heavily in submarines and would likely have pursued a similar strategy of sea denial had tensions with the NATO powers escalated to open warfare.

Since World War II, the most notable example of a sea denial strategy involved the so-called 'Tanker War,' wherein Iran and Iraq sought to close the Persian Gulf.

Today the term A2/AD has gained traction, and refers to a sort of sea denial strategy where a state aspires to challenge access to certain areas and at the same time hinder the freedom of movement in an adjacent area. It can include a combined effort of the navy, air force and army. The army deploys missiles and sensors in an effort to produce effective coastal defensive moats. The air force deploys assets that can support intelligence gathering, surveillance and reconnaissance and even targets ships with airborne weaponry. The navy deploys everything from sea mines, surface combatants to submarines in a system of layered defence and distributed lethality (Till 2018, p. 193 – 197).

Modern sea denial relates to the area denial weapon, for example in the context of a land power using land-based missiles to strike sea targets. Such missiles can follow cruise missile (terrain-skimming) or ballistic missile trajectories. In response to these threats, the U.S. Navy has developed the Littoral Combat Ship.

See also

 Fleet in being
 Sea control
 Commerce raiding

References

 Corbett, Julian S. 2018. Some Principles of Maritime Strategy. Bd. 1911. Adansonia Press.
 Speller, Ian. 2019. Understanding Naval Warfare. 2. edition. Routledge.
 Till, Geoffrey. 2018. Seapower. A Guide for the Twenty-First Century. 4th edition. Cass Series: Naval Policy and History. 2 Park Square, Milton Park, Abdingdon Oxon, OX14 4RN: Routledge.

Area denial weapons
Naval warfare